Kabudband (also Romanized as Kabūdband) is a village in Poshtkuh Rural District, within the Central District of Firuzkuh County, Tehran Province, Iran. The 2006 census noted its existence, but its population was not reported.

References 

Populated places in Firuzkuh County